Brent Yonts  (March 21, 1949 – August 20, 2021) was an American politician and a Democratic member of the Kentucky House of Representatives from District 15. He took office in 1997 and was defeated for re-election in 2016 by Republican Melinda Gibbons Prunty.

Yonts died from COVID-19 at a hospital in Owensboro, Kentucky, on August 20, 2021, aged 72.

Education
Yonts earned his BS from Murray State University, and his JD from the University of Kentucky College of Law.

Elections
1994 Yonts ran in the District 15 1994 Democratic Primary, but lost to Charles Nelson, who went on to win the November 8, 1994 General election.
1996 When Representative Nelson left the Legislature and left the seat open, Yonts won the six-way 1996 Democratic Primary and won the November 5, 1996 General election against Republican nominee Marshall Prunty.
1998 Yonts was unopposed for both the 1998 Democratic Primary and the November 3, 1998 General election.
2000 Yonts was unopposed for both the 2000 Democratic Primary and the November 7, 2000 General election, winning with 9,448 votes.
2002 Yonts was unopposed for both the 2002 Democratic Primary and the November 5, 2002 General election, winning with 8,348 votes.
2004 Yonts was unopposed for both the 2004 Democratic Primary and the November 2, 2004 General election, winning with 10,259 votes.
2006 Yonts unopposed for the 2006 Democratic Primary and won the November 7, 2006 General election with 9,315 votes (71.6%) against Republican nominee Matthew Oates.
2008 Yonts was challenged in the 2008 Democratic Primary, winning with 5,805 votes (69.4%) and was unopposed for the November 4, 2008 General election, winning with 12,275 votes.
2010 Yonts was unopposed for both the May 18, 2010 Democratic Primary and the November 2, 2010 General election, winning with 8,288 votes.
2012 Yonts and returning 1996 Republican opponent Marshall Prunty were both unopposed for their May 22, 2012 primaries, setting up a rematch; Yonts won the November 6, 2012 General election with 8,696 votes (56.0%) against Prunty.
2016 Yonts was defeated in the general election by Melinda Gibbons Prunty (wife of Marshall Prunty), who carried 57.1% of the vote.

References

External links
Official page  at the Kentucky General Assembly

Brent Yonts at Ballotpedia
Brent Yonts at OpenSecrets

1949 births
2021 deaths
20th-century American lawyers
20th-century American politicians
21st-century American politicians
Deaths from the COVID-19 pandemic in Kentucky
Kentucky lawyers
Democratic Party members of the Kentucky House of Representatives
Military personnel from Kentucky
Murray State University alumni
People from Greenville, Kentucky
United States Army officers
University of Kentucky College of Law alumni